Carlo Lafranchi (22 July 1924 – 1 April 2003) was a Swiss racing cyclist. He rode in the 1952 Tour de France.

References

1924 births
2003 deaths
Swiss male cyclists
Place of birth missing